We Gave It All Away... Now We Are Taking It Back is the second album by Mungolian Jet Set. It is a double album mostly composed of heavily modified remixes with a handful of original tracks.

Track list

2009 remix albums
Mungolian Jet Set albums
Smalltown Supersound albums